Chae Ri-na (born Bak Hyeon-ju, ; February 3, 1978) is a South Korean singer. She debuted in 1995 as a member of the best-selling co-ed vocal group Roo'ra. She was also a member of the girl group Diva, which debuted in 1997, and the duo Girl Friends, which debuted in 2006.

Discography 

 The First Step (2002)

Personal life 
Chae married professional baseball player Park Yong-geun in 2016.

Awards and nominations

References 

1978 births
Girl Friends (band) members
South Korean female idols
K-pop singers
Living people
South Korean women pop singers
People from Yangju
21st-century South Korean singers
21st-century South Korean women singers